The following is a list of awards and nominations received by Irish actor Colin Farrell.

Awards and nominations

Special awards

See also
 List of Colin Farrell performances

References 

Farrell, Colin